Several national governments and two international organizations have created lists of organizations that they designate as terrorist. The following list of designated terrorist groups lists groups designated as terrorist by current and former national governments, and inter-governmental organizations. Such designations have often had a significant effect on the groups' activities. Many organizations that have been designated as terrorist have denied using terrorism as a military tactic to achieve their goals, and there is no international consensus on the legal definition of terrorism. Some organisations have multiple parts or components, one or more of which may be designated as terrorist while others are not.

This listing does not include unaffiliated individuals accused of terrorism, which is considered lone wolf terrorism. This list also excludes groups which might be widely considered terrorist, but who are not officially so designated according to the criteria specified above.

Organizations currently officially designated as terrorist organizations by various governments

Organizations formerly designated as terrorist
Below is the list of organizations that have officially been designated as terrorist in the past, by the respective parties, but have since been delisted.

Process of designation
Among the countries that publish a list of designated terrorist organizations, some have a clear established procedure for listing and delisting, and some are opaque. The Berghof Foundation argues that opaque delisting conditions reduce the incentive for the organization to abandon terrorism, while fuelling radicalism.

Australia

Since 2002, the Australian Government maintains a list of terrorist organizations under the Security Legislation Amendment (Terrorism) Act 2002. Listing, de-listing and re-listing follows a protocol that mainly involves the Australian Security Intelligence Organisation and the Attorney-General's Department.

Bahrain

The Ministry of Foreign Affairs maintains a public list of designated terrorist individuals and entities.

Canada

Since 18 December 2001, section 83.05 of the Canadian Criminal Code allows the Governor in Council to maintain a list of entities that are engaged in terrorism, facilitating it, or acting on behalf of such an entity.

A review is conducted every five years by the Minister of Public Safety to determine whether an entity should remain listed. Entities may apply for a judicial review by the Chief Justice of the Federal Court. Both ministerial and judicial reviews are published in the Canada Gazette. The list is also published on the website of Public Safety Canada.

European Union

The European Union has two lists of designated terrorist organisations that provide for different sanctions for the two groups. The first list is copied from the United Nations, and the second is an autonomous list.  there are 21 organizations in the autonomous list.

India

Under the Unlawful Activities (Prevention) Act, the Ministry of Home Affairs maintains a list of banned organizations.

Iran

The state maintains a list of designated terror groups; it includes the US Armed Forces, CENTCOM.

Israel

The Israeli list of "Terrorists Organizations and Unauthorized Associations" is available at the National Bureau for Counter Terror Financing of Israel.

According to Just Security, the Israeli designation on 22 October 2021, of six West Bank Palestinian civil society organizations as terrorist organizations under Israel's counterterrorism law of 2016 highlights the flawed nature of the law and says that "In 2021, it should be clear to everyone that criminalizing human rights groups on the basis of classified intelligence is absolutely unacceptable." Human Rights Watch says that the 2016 law is in the category of countries with "Overbroad or Vague Definitions of "Terrorism"" and includes expressing support for a listed group such as waving a flag or singing its anthem, punishable by up to three years in prison.

In a statement on 26 October 2021, UN High Commissioner for Human Rights Michelle Bachelet said recent events "highlight how problematic Israel's counterterrorism law is, including its overly broad definition of terrorism, problems of due process and the manner in which it allows evidence to be kept secret,"

Kazakhstan
The Government of Kazakhstan publishes a list of terrorist organizations banned by courts.

Kyrgyzstan
Kyrgyzstan maintains a consolidated list of "destructive, extremist and terrorist" organizations officially banned by courts.  the list includes 20 organizations and 12 of them are designated as terrorist organizations.

Malaysia
The Ministry of Home Affairs of Malaysia maintains a sanction list of individuals and organizations involved in terrorist activity. The list is regulated by the Anti-Money Laundering, Anti-Terrorism Financing and Proceeds From Illegal Activities Act 2001 and is complementary to the United Nations Security Council sanction lists.

Myanmar
In Myanmar (formerly Burma), the Anti-Terrorism Central Committee is responsible for designating terrorist organisations in accordance with the country's counter-terrorism law. Designations must be approved by the union government before being official. There are only two groups on Myanmar's terror list: the Arakan Rohingya Salvation Army and Arakan Army, declared on 25 August 2017 and January 2019

New Zealand
The New Zealand Police are responsible for coordinating any requests to the Prime Minister for designation as a terrorist entity. The designation of terrorist organizations is also guided by the Terrorism Suppression Act 2002. New Zealand also abides by several United Nations resolutions dealing with counter-terrorism including UN Resolutions 1267, 1989, 2253, 1988, and 1373.

Pakistan

Government of Pakistan under section 11-B of Anti Terrorism Act can declare an organization believed to be concerned with terrorism as a Proscribed Organization or put it under surveillance. Ministry of Interior issues the formal notification of proscription of an organization. National Counter Terrorism Authority is primarily concerned with monitoring for any signs of re-emergence through intelligence coordination, once an organization is proscribed.

People's Republic of China

In 2003, the Ministry of Public Security published a list of "East Turkestan" terrorist organizations on its website mps.gov.cn. This list was translated to English by the Embassy of the People's Republic of China in the US.

Philippines
The first group to be officially listed as a terrorist organization under the Human Security Act of 2007 is the Abu Sayyaf on 10 September 2015 by the Basilan provincial court. The Department of Foreign Affairs publishes a list of designated terrorist organizations under the Human Security Act or the Terrorism Financing Prevention and Suppression Act of 2012.

The passage of the Anti-Terrorism Act of 2020 automatically recognized all terrorist group designations by the United Nations under Philippine law which includes the Islamic State of Iraq and the Levant (ISIL). Under the same law, the Anti-Terrorism Council was formed to designate groups as terrorists.

Russia

A single federal list of organizations recognized as terrorist is used by the Supreme Court of the Russian Federation. The National Anti-Terrorism Committee maintains a list of terrorist organizations on its website nac.gov.ru, named "Federal United list of Terrorist Organizations".

Sri Lanka
Sri Lanka bans using the 'Prevention of Terrorism (Temporary Provisions) Act, No. 48 of 1979 regulations, cited as the Prevention of Terrorism (Proscription of Extremist Organizations).

Tajikistan
The National Bank of Tajikistan publishes national lists of individuals and organizations declared terrorist or extremists by the Supreme Court.

In 2015, the Islamic Renaissance Party of Tajikistan was banned in Tajikistan as a terrorist organization.

Ukraine
 
In Ukraine, the Donetsk and Luhansk People's Republics are designated as terrorist organizations. Ukrainian authorities claim that the two organizations are made up of a rigid hierarchy, financing channels and supply of weapons with the purpose of deliberately propagating violence, seizing hostages, carrying out subversive activity, assassinations, and the intimidation of citizens.

United Arab Emirates
The Cabinet of the United Arab Emirates periodically issues resolutions to include individuals and organizations on its terrorist list.  issued resolutions are 2014/41, 2017/18, 2017/28, 2017/45, 2018/24 and 2018/50.

United Nations

The United Nations does not have a list of all terrorist organizations. Instead, it has several lists focusing on international sanctions in particular contexts. The United Nations Security Council Resolution 1267 established lists focused Al-Qaeda, the Taliban and their associates. The listing process was later extended to include the Islamic State of Iraq and the Levant.

United Kingdom

The United Kingdom Home Office maintains a list of proscribed terrorist groups.

United States

The United States Department of State maintains a list of Foreign Terrorist Organizations.

See also
 List of charities accused of ties to terrorism
 List of non-state groups accused of terrorism
 List of criminal enterprises, gangs, and syndicates
 List of fascist movements
 List of Islamic terrorist organizations
 List of Ku Klux Klan organizations
 List of neo-Nazi organizations
 List of organizations designated by the Southern Poverty Law Center as hate groups
 List of white nationalist organizations
 Violent non-state actor

Notes

References

Terrorist groups
Organized crime-related lists
 
Designated terrorist organizations